Carex torta, the twisted sedge, is a species of flowering plant in the family Cyperaceae, native to eastern Canada and the central and eastern United States. It is a specialist on gravelly and rocky stream and river banks, moreso when recently scoured.

References

torta
Flora of Eastern Canada
Flora of Oklahoma
Flora of Iowa
Flora of Missouri
Flora of Arkansas
Flora of Illinois
Flora of the Northeastern United States
Flora of Kentucky
Flora of Tennessee
Flora of Alabama
Flora of Virginia
Flora of North Carolina
Flora of South Carolina
Plants described in 1843